Chittagong-6 is a constituency represented in the Jatiya Sangsad (National Parliament) of Bangladesh since 2014 by A.B.M. Fazle Karim Chowdhury of the Awami League.

Boundaries 
The constituency encompasses Raozan Upazila.

History 
The constituency was created for the first general elections in newly independent Bangladesh, held in 1973.

Ahead of the 2008 general election, the Election Commission redrew constituency boundaries to reflect population changes revealed by the 2001 Bangladesh census. The 2008 redistricting altered the boundaries of the constituency.

Ahead of the 2014 general election, the Election Commission renumbered the seat for Chittagong-16 (Sandwip) to Chittagong-3, bumping up by one the suffix of the former constituency of that name and higher numbered constituencies in the district. Thus Chittagong-6 covers the area previously covered by Chittagong-5. Previously Chittagong-6 encompassed Rangunia Upazila and one union parishad of Boalkhali Upazila: Sreepur Kharandwip.

Members of Parliament 
Key

Elections

Elections in the 2010s 
A.B.M. Fazle Karim Chowdhury was elected unopposed in the 2014 general election after opposition parties withdrew their candidacies in a boycott of the election.

Elections in the 2000s

Elections in the 1990s

References

External links
 

Parliamentary constituencies in Bangladesh
Chittagong District